Sergey Kovalenko may refer to:

 Sergei Kovalenko (1947–2002), Soviet basketball player
 Sergei Kovalenko (sport shooter) (born 1970), Russian sport shooter
 Sergey Kovalenko (wrestler) (born 1976), Russian wrestler
 Serhiy Kovalenko (born 1984), Ukrainian footballer
 Siarhei Kavalenka (born 1975), Belarusian activist